Bendaoud is a town and commune in Relizane Province, Algeria. According to the 2008 census it has a population of 17,953. It is located just to the southwest of Relizane.

References

Communes of Relizane Province
Relizane Province